SECN may refer to:
SEC Network